The Isthar Patriotic List (Arabic: قائمة عشتار الوطنية) is an Assyrian political list that was formed to run in the 2009 Iraqi governorate elections.

The list's biggest party is the Chaldean Syriac Assyrian Popular Council, a party founded in 2007 whose opponents claim is financially supported by the Kurdistan Democratic Party.

In the January 2009 governorate council elections, the list included:

 Chaldean Syriac Assyrian Popular Council (CSAPC)
 Bet Nahrain Democratic Party (BNDP)
 Chaldean National Congress (CNC)
 Patriotic Union of Beth Nahrain (PUBN)
 Al-Suryan Independent Gathering Movement (SIGM)
 Notables of Qaraqosh
 Chaldean Cultural Society

The list won the reserved Assyrian seats in both Baghdad and the Ninawa, electing Giwargis Esho Sada (BNDP) and Sa'ad Tanyos Jajji (SIGM) respectively.

The list was backed by Kurdistan Regional Government minister Sarkis Aghajan Mamendo.

References

See also
Politics of Iraq
Assyrian politics in Iraq

Assyrian political parties
Electoral lists for Iraqi elections
Political party alliances in Iraq
Political parties in Kurdistan Region
Political parties of minorities in Iraq